Touria Samiri (born 1 February 1988)  is a female Moroccan-born Italian middle distance runner and steeplechase runner who competed at one edition of the IAAF World Cross Country Championships at senior level (2013).

Biography
Her best season was the 2013, when she won one national championships at individual senior level (cross country running). and was finalist at 2013 Mediterranean Games, thanks to these results she got azzurra jersey for the World Cross Country Championships.

Achievements

National titles
Italian Athletics Championships
Cross country running: 2013

References

External links
 

1988 births
Living people
Italian female middle-distance runners
Italian female steeplechase runners
Moroccan emigrants to Italy
Italian sportspeople of African descent
Competitors at the 2013 Mediterranean Games
Italian female cross country runners
Mediterranean Games competitors for Italy